Lenkene brytes (The Chains Are Broken) is a Norwegian film from 1938 that was directed by Olav Dalgard and Fredrik Barth. Lenkene brytes is the second film in the "worker trilogy." The other two films are Det drønner gjennom dalen (1938) and Gryr i Norden (1939).

The film addresses the issue of alcohol abuse, which also impacted the organized labor movement. It is about life in working-class youth groups, the work of the abstinence movement, and friendship, unity, and love between young people. Sigurd Evensmo wrote the script, and the film was created as a feature film for young people.

Cast
Tryggve Larssen as Heien
Jack Fjeldstad as Jan Heien
Mai Lindegard as Gerda Bratt
Ebba Toje as Mrs. Bratt
Kolbjørn Brenda as the chairman
Åge Pedersen as Sverre
Pehr Qværnstrøm as Ludvigsen
Helge Essmar as a bootlegger
Abigael Heber Magnussøn

References

External links
 
 Lenkene brytes at the National Library of Norway

Norwegian black-and-white films
1938 films
1930s Norwegian-language films
Norwegian drama films
Films directed by Olav Dalgard